Attorney General Beardsley may refer to:

Grenville Beardsley (1898–1960), Attorney General of Illinois
Samuel Beardsley (1790–1860), Attorney General of New York